Alien Nation: The Enemy Within (original airdate: November 12, 1996) was the fourth television film produced to continue the story after the cancellation of Alien Nation. It was written by Diane Frolov and Andrew Schneider, and directed by Kenneth Johnson.

Plot
Detective Matthew Sikes and his Tenctonese partner George Francisco investigate a group of Tenctonese called the Eenos.  The subplot involves Tenctonese binnaum Albert Einstein and his new bride May attempting to have a child (with George's help) -- a reversal of the Alien Nation episode "Three to Tango".

Production
Shot back to back with Alien Nation: The Udara Legacy as part of a ten week shoot termed "grueling" Actors on the  series thought these two were the last of he series

Cast

Main cast

Additional cast

See also

References

External links
 

American science fiction television films
Enemy Within, The
1996 television films
1996 films
1996 drama films
Television sequel films
Television series reunion films
Television films based on television series
20th Century Fox Television films
Films directed by Kenneth Johnson (producer)
1990s American films